Kenmare is a Gaelic Athletic Association District Team from County Kerry.
The team competes as a joint divisional side with other clubs from the Kenmare area in the county championships.
Most matches are played in Templenoe nowadays but some are played at Father Breen Park, Kenmare.
The Kenmare District is the smallest such district in Kerry consisting of 4 clubs

Member Clubs
Kenmare
Kilgarvan
Templenoe
Tuosist

Honours
 Kerry Senior Football Championship (2)
 Winners: 1974, 1987
 Runners-Up: 1952, 1954, 1976, 2016
 Kerry Minor Football Championship
 Runners-Up: 1959, 2012
 Kerry Under-21 Football Championship (3)
 Winners: 1985, 2014, 2017
 Runners-Up: 1981, 1982, 1984

Hurling

Grades

Football

Grades

Finnegan Cup
The 4 clubs in the Kenmare District play for the Finnegan Cup  in the Kenmare district board championship.

Roll of honour

Famous players
 Stephen O'Brien
 Seán O'Shea
 Paul O'Connor
 Pat Spillane
 Tom Spillane
 Mick Spillane
 Alan O'Sullivan
 Phil O'Sullivan Though from Tuosist parish Phil O'Sullivan played for Kenmare. He captained Kerry to an All Ireland Football title in 1924, played with Kenmare and won a Senior Co. Hurling medal in 1917.
 Mickey O'Sullivan Mickey "Ned" O’Sullivan won a county league medal in 1972, as well as a senior county championship in 1974. It was Kenmare's first county title ever, with a second medal following in 1987.

References

Divisional boards of Kerry GAA
Gaelic games clubs in County Kerry
Gaelic football clubs in County Kerry